George Howie (April 26, 1899 Damascus, Syria – November 11, 1979 San Luis Obispo, California) was an American racecar driver.

Indianapolis 500 results

References

American racing drivers
Indianapolis 500 drivers
1899 births
1979 deaths
Sportspeople from Damascus
Emigrants from the Ottoman Empire to the United States